The Lester Young Buddy Rich Trio is a jazz trio album recorded in Hollywood, California in March–April 1946 by Lester Young, Nat King Cole and Buddy Rich.

Release history
The first 4 tracks were originally released on Mercury Records as The Lester Young Trio.  The remaining 4 tracks were released on Norman Granz' Clef Records label as The Lester Young Trio No. 2 before all 8 tracks were combined and released by Granz' Norgran Records label as The Lester Young Buddy Rich Trio.  Nat King Cole was under contract with a different record label at the time so was credited only as "Aye Guy" on the original Mercury / Clef / Norgran releases.

In 1994 Verve Records released a CD version of The Lester Young Trio which combined all 8 tracks from the 1946 Hollywood trio recordings, plus an alternate take of "I Cover the Waterfront" and an additional shortened version of "Back to the Land", with 4 additional tracks recorded earlier by a quintet with Nat King Cole (but without Lester Young or Buddy Rich).

Track listing
LP side A
 "Back to the Land" (Young) – 3:52
 "I've Found a New Baby" (Palmer, Williams) – 4:04
 "I Cover the Waterfront" (Green, Heyman) – 4:03
 "Somebody Loves Me" (MacDonald, DeSylva, Gershwin) – 3:54
LP side B
 "I Want to Be Happy" (Caesar, Youmans) – 3:56
 "The Man I Love" (Gershwin, Gershwin) – 4:48
 "Mean to Me" (Ahlert, Turk) – 4:09
 "Peg O' My Heart" (Bryan, Fisher) – 4:02

Personnel
 Lester Young – tenor saxophone
 Buddy Rich – drums
 Nat King Cole (credited as "Aye Guy" on the original releases) – piano

References / notes

 The Lester Young Buddy Rich Trio at jazzdisco.org

1955 albums
Lester Young albums
Buddy Rich albums
Albums produced by Norman Granz
Norgran Records albums
Verve Records albums